Herbert James Francis (26 June 1885 – 21 July 1958) was an Australian rules footballer who played for the Melbourne Football Club in the Victorian Football League (VFL).

Notes

External links 
 
 

1885 births
1958 deaths
Australian rules footballers from Victoria (Australia)
Melbourne Football Club players